Wladimir P. Seidel (December 21, 1907 – January 12, 1981) was a Russian-born German-American mathematician, and Doctor of Mathematics. He held a fellowship as a Benjamin Peirce Professor in Harvard University. During World War II, he was with the Montreal Theory group for the National Research Council of Canada.

Life
He was born in Odessa, Russian Empire on December 21, 1907.

Career
He earned his Ph.D. from Ludwig-Maximilians-Universität in München (February 26, 1930) on a dissertation entitled Über die Ränderzuordnung bei konformen Abbildungen, advised by Constantin Carathéodory.

He joined the faculty of Mathematics at Harvard University (as Benjamin Peirce Instructor, 1932–33), at University of Rochester (1941–55), at The Institute for Advanced Study in Princeton (1952–53), at University of Notre Dame (1955–63), and at Wayne State University in Detroit (since 1963).

During World War II, he was with the Montreal Theory group for the National Research Council of Canada.

The Seidel class is named after him.

He was married to Leah Lappin-Seidel (1904–1999).

Publications

References

20th-century German mathematicians
German emigrants to the United States
Ludwig Maximilian University of Munich alumni
University of Rochester faculty
Harvard University faculty
Princeton University faculty
University of Notre Dame faculty
Wayne State University faculty
People from Detroit
Scientists from Odesa
1907 births
1981 deaths
20th-century American mathematicians